Galactosylceramidase (or galactocerebrosidase) is an enzyme that in humans is encoded by the GALC gene. Galactosylceramidase is an enzyme which removes galactose from ceramide derivatives (galactosylceramides).

Galactosylceramidase is a lysosomal protein which hydrolyzes the galactose ester bonds of galactosylceramide, galactosylsphingosine, lactosylceramide, and monogalactosyldiglyceride. Mutations in this gene have been associated with Krabbe disease, also known as galactosylceramide lipidosis.

References

Further reading

External links
  GeneReviews/NCBI/NIH/UW entry on Krabbe disease
  OMIM entries on Krabbe disease
 
 PDBe-KB provides an overview of all the structure information available in the PDB for Mlouse Galactocerebrosidase

EC 3.2.1